Michael Zandberg (born April 16, 1980, in Petah Tikva) is a former Israeli football player. He is the current head coach of Hapoel Tel Aviv's youth team.

Career

He played for Hapoel Petah Tikva until he was 22 years of age, playing 130 games in all club competitions.
In the summer of 2002 he moved to Maccabi Haifa where he played 4 years. He won 3 championships, a Toto Cup and also played in the UEFA Champions League with Haifa. Zandberg made 172 caps in all club competitions, scoring 43 goals and provided 20 assists while part of the club.

In the 2000s, Zandberg was one of the best wingers in Israeli football and was a regular member of the Israeli national team having won 20 caps for the national side. In that time period, Zandberg received interest from teams in the Dutch Eredivisie, the English Premiership, and from the German Bundesliga.

In the summer of 2006, Zandberg transferred to Beitar Jerusalem for a 4-year contract worth $1,200,000. Overall in all club competitions he played 106 games, scored 15 goals, and provided 22 assists in 3 seasons at Beitar.
In May 2007, it was revealed that Zandberg had agreed on a $600,000 one-year contract with English side Sheffield United, but when Sheffield United was relegated to the English 2nd division on the final day of the season, Zandberg decided against the move.
At the end of 2006–07 Israeli Premier League, Zandberg was chosen as the Player of the Season.

In July 2009, he signed a one-year contract with Hapoel Tel Aviv worth $150,000. After half a season with Hapoel he was transferred to Bnei Yehuda.

In July 2010, he signed a one-year contract with Maccabi Petah Tikva.

After a very poor season in Petah Tikva he was again on the move, this time landing a one-year deal with Hapoel Haifa.

In July 2012, he signed with Hapoel Ramat Gan, his boyhood club.

On October 17, 2018, Zandberg announced his retirement from an active game at the age of 38. In 2020, at the age of 40, he came back from retirement and joined Hamakthesh Givatayim.

Personal life
His sister is Israeli politician Tamar Zandberg.

Honours
Israeli Premier League (5):
2003–04, 2004–05, 2005–06, 2006–07, 2007–08
Toto Cup (1):
2005–06
State Cup (2):
2008, 2013
Israeli Footballer of the Year (1):
2007

References

External links
 
 ONE profile
 
 

1980 births
Living people
Jewish Israeli sportspeople
Israeli footballers
Hapoel Petah Tikva F.C. players
Israel international footballers
Maccabi Haifa F.C. players
Beitar Jerusalem F.C. players
Hapoel Tel Aviv F.C. players
Hapoel Ramat Gan F.C. players
Hapoel Nir Ramat HaSharon F.C. players
Hapoel Rishon LeZion F.C. players
Israeli Premier League players
Liga Leumit players
Israeli people of Polish-Jewish descent
Footballers from Ramat Gan
Association football wingers
Association football midfielders
Israeli Footballer of the Year recipients